Shayban ibn Ahmad ibn Tulun was the fifth and last Emir of the Tulunids in Egypt (904-905).

A son of the dynasty's founder, Ahmad ibn Tulun, he succeeded his nephew Harun ibn Khumarawayh, who was killed in a mutiny in December 904 during the invasion of Egypt by the Abbasid Caliphate. After years of mismanagement, the emirate was beyond rescue - he was forced to retreat with his army to Fustat, where on 10 January 905 he surrendered unconditionally to the Abbasid commander Muhammad ibn Sulayman al-Katib, ending the rule of the Tulunids.

10th-century Tulunid emirs
10th-century monarchs in Africa
Tulunid emirs